United Nations Security Council Resolution 1, adopted without a vote on 25 January 1946, called for the Military Staff Committee to meet for the first time in London on 1 February 1946. The Committee was to be composed of the Chiefs of Staff of the military organizations of the five permanent members. The Committee's formation had been called for under Article 47 of the United Nations Charter, and this resolution directed the Committee to convene to make proposals for the body's organization and standard procedures.

The Security Council also had "Discussion of the best means of arriving at the conclusion of the special agreements [for the provision of armed forces and related facilities] referred to in the Charter (Article 43)" on its agenda for the meeting, though this item was deferred. The United Nations General Assembly passed its first resolution the previous day.

See also
 List of United Nations Security Council Resolutions 1 to 100 (1946–1953)

References

External links
 
 Text of the Resolution at undocs.org

 0001
January 1946 events